Park Sae-young (born 11 August 1994) is a South Korean handball player for Gyeong and the South Korean national team.

She participated at the 2017 World Women's Handball Championship.

References

1994 births
Living people
South Korean female handball players
Handball players at the 2014 Asian Games
Handball players at the 2018 Asian Games
Asian Games gold medalists for South Korea
Asian Games medalists in handball
Medalists at the 2014 Asian Games
Medalists at the 2018 Asian Games
Universiade silver medalists for South Korea
Universiade medalists in handball
Handball players from Seoul
Medalists at the 2015 Summer Universiade